Sorø Old Cemetery (Danish: Sorø Gamle Kirkegård), owned by Sorø Academy, is one of the oldest cemeteries still in use in Denmark.

History
It opened in connection with the establishment of Sorø Abbey in the second half of the 12th century. The cemetery was expanded to four times its original size in the beginning of the 19th century. It was refurbished in 1940–1944.

Burials
 Thøger Binneballe (1818–1900),architect active in Norway
 Jacob Hornemann Bredsdorff (1799–1841), polymath, natural scientist, linguist
 Bartholomæus Hoff (1840–1912), rector
 Bernhard Severin Ingemann
 Lucie Ingemann
 Carl Emil Kiellerup
 Frederik Martin
 Christian Molbech
 Carl Emil Mundt
 Siegfred Neuhaus (1879–1955), painter
 Hans Palludan Rasmussen
 Anna Sarauw
 Andreas Schytte
 Christian Ludvig Stemann
 Poul Hagerup Tregder
 Hans Ussing
 Henrik Ussing
 Palle Wodschow

References

Buildings and structures in Sorø Municipality
Cemeteries in Denmark